The New Zealand Wool Board was established in 1944 under the Wool Industry Act.  McKinsey & Company published a report in 2000 that sparked two years of debate for referendums and reforms to the New Zealand Wool Board. In 2001, McKinsey's recommendations were implemented and Wool Board was dissolved and was completely restructured.

Objective
Its key objective was 'to obtain, in the interests of growers, the best possible returns for New Zealand Wool'.

Funding
It was funded by a levy on the proceeds of growers' wool sales.

See also
 International Wool Secretariat
 Australian Wool Board
 South African Wool Board
 British Wool Marketing Board

References

External links

Marketing boards
Wool organizations
Wool Board